Cristian Alfonso Cásseres (born 29 June 1977) is a Venezuelan football striker who made a total number of 28 appearances (two goals) for the Venezuela national team between 1999 and 2008, and last played for Metropolitanos FC.

Club career
He started his professional career at Estudiantes de Mérida in 1996. Cásseres also played in Mexico.

References

External links

1977 births
Living people
Footballers from Caracas
Venezuelan footballers
Venezuela international footballers
Association football forwards
1999 Copa América players
2001 Copa América players
2004 Copa América players
Venezuelan Primera División players
Liga MX players
Deportivo Miranda F.C. players
Atlas F.C. footballers
La Piedad footballers
UA Maracaibo players
Deportivo Italia players
Real Esppor Club players
Deportivo Táchira F.C. players
Atlético Venezuela C.F. players
Liga Dominicana de Fútbol players
Venezuelan expatriate footballers
Expatriate footballers in Mexico
Expatriate footballers in the Dominican Republic
Venezuelan expatriate sportspeople in Mexico
Venezuelan expatriate sportspeople in the Dominican Republic
20th-century Venezuelan people
21st-century Venezuelan people